The Urra=hubullu  is a major Babylonian glossary or "encyclopedia". It consists of Sumerian and Akkadian lexical lists ordered by topic. The canonical version extends to 24 tablets. The conventional title is the first gloss, ur5-ra and ḫubullu meaning "interest-bearing debt" in Sumerian and Akkadian, respectively. One bilingual version from Ugarit [RS2.(23)+] is Sumerian/Hurrian rather than  Sumerian/Akkadian.

A partial table of contents:

 Tablet 4: naval vehicles
 Tablet 5: terrestrial vehicles
 Tablets 13 to 15: systematic enumeration of the names of domestic animals, terrestrial animals, and birds (including bats)
 Tablet 16: stones
 Tablet 17: plants.
 Tablet 22: star names

The bulk of the collection was compiled in the Old Babylonian period (early 2nd millennium BC), with pre-canonical forerunner documents extending into the later 3rd millennium.

Like other canonical glossaries, the Urra=hubullu was often used for scribal practice. Other Babylonian glossaries include:

 Ea: a family of lists that give the simple signs of the cuneiform writing system with their pronunciation and Akkadian meanings. (MSL volume 14)
 "Table of Measures":  conversion tables for grain, weights and surface measurements. Again, it is not clear how these tablets were used.  
 Lú and Lú=ša, a list of professions (MSL volume 12)
 Izi, a list of compound words ordered by increasing complexity 
 Diri "limited to compound logograms whose reading cannot be inferred from their individual components; it also includes marginal cases such as reduplications, presence or absence of determinatives, and the like." (MSL volume 14)
 Nigga, Erimhuš and other school texts

References
Benno Landsberger The Series HAR-ra="hubullu", Materials for the Sumerian lexicon (MSL), 5. 6, 7, 9, 10 and 11, Rome: Pontificium Institutum Biblicum, 1957-
A. Poebel, The Beginning of the Fourteenth Tablet of Harra Hubullu,  The American Journal of Semitic Languages and Literatures, Vol. 52, No. 2 (Jan., 1936), pp. 111-114
Soldt, W. H. van, "Babylonian Lexical, Religious and Literary Texts, and Scribal Education at Ugarit and its Implications for the Alphabetic Literary Texts," in: Ugarit: ein ostmediterranes Kulturzentrum in Alten Orient: Ergebnisse und Perspektiven der Forschung'', Dietrich and Loretz eds., Abhandlungen zur Literatur Alt-Syrien-Palästinas, vol 7, Münster: Ugarit-Verlag, 1995, 171-212

External links
 How to Recognize a Scribal School 

Glossaries
Mesopotamian literature